Prackenbach is a municipality in the district of Regen in Bavaria in Germany.

History
Prackenbach was mentioned in 1280 as a noble residence. The Schälchl zu Krailing family owned the Hofmark in the 15th and 16th centuries in the Krailing district. The residence belonged to the Straubing Rentamt and the Viechtach District Court of the Electorate of Bavaria. In the course of the administrative reforms in the Kingdom of Bavaria, today's community came into being with the municipal edict of 1818. On May 1, 1978, the previously independent communities of Moosbach and Ruhmannsdorf were incorporated.

Districts
Prackenbach has 66 districts:

 Ahrain
 Altwies
 Anger
 Aurieden
 Bartlberg
 Berg
 Boxberg
 Dumpf
 Egern
 Egernhäusl
 Ehrenhof
 Engelsdorf
 Fichtental
 Frauenwies
 Geigenmühle
 Grub
 Hagengrub
 Heiligenwies
 Heilmberg
 Herzogsäge
 Hetzelsdorf
 Hinterhagengrub
 Hintermaulendorf
 Igleinsberg
 Kager
 Krailing
 Kreilstein
 Lehen
 Leuthen
 Lexanger
 Maierhof
 Meidengrub
 Mitterdorf
 Moosbach
 Moosbacherau
 Moosberg
 Neuhäusel
 Neumühle
 Obermühle
 Oberreisach
 Oberrubendorf
 Oberstein
 Oberviechtafell
 Ödland
 Prackenbach
 Rattersberg
 Ruhmannsdorf
 Schöpferhof
 Schwaben
 Schwabwies
 Schwarzendorf
 Steinhof
 Steinmühle
 Tafertshof
 Thannhof
 Tresdorf
 Unterreisach
 Unterrubendorf
 Unterviechtafell
 Voggenzell
 Vormühle
 Wiedenhof
 Wiedenmühle
 Zeitlau
 Zeitlhof
 Zell

References

Regen (district)